Sean Cusack (born 27 January 1966) is a former professional rugby league footballer who played in the 1990s. He played at representative level for Scotland, and at club level for Carlisle.

Career

Club career
Cusack joined Carlisle from Broughton Red Rose in May 1996, he played 35 games for Carlisle Border Raiders.

International honours
Cusack won four caps for Scotland between 1995 and 1997

References

1966 births
Living people
Carlisle RLFC players
English people of Scottish descent
English rugby league players
Place of birth missing (living people)
Scotland national rugby league team players
Rugby league centres
Rugby league second-rows